Existence is the second album by the German progressive metal band, Dark Suns. For this release, the band dropped the harsh vocals that were used for the band's previous album Swanlike.

Track listing

Personnel
 Niko Knappe – vocals, drums
 Maik Knappe – Guitars
 Torsten Wenzel – Guitars
 Christoph Bormann – Bass
 Thomas Bremer – Keyboards

References

2005 albums
Dark Suns albums